The Northern Intercollegiate Athletic Conference is an independent college athletic conference. The NIAC is made up of ten schools in Minnesota, North Dakota, South Dakota and Manitoba. The NIAC sponsors men’s and women’s basketball for member institutions.

The conference features five Christian colleges (Canadian Mennonite, Free Lutheran Bible, Oak Hills Christian, Providence and Trinity Bible) as well as four Native American schools: Leech Lake Tribal (Leech Lake Band of Ojibwe), Nueta Hidatsa Sahnish College (Three Affiliated Tribes), Sisseton Wahpeton College (Sisseton Wahpeton Oyate) and Turtle Mountain (Turtle Mountain Band of Chippewa).

History 
Leech Lake Tribal and Red Lake Nation joined the NIAC in 2013.

Canadian Mennonite and Cankdeska Cikana were added to the league for the 2016-17 season.

Expansion for 2017-18 included Providence University College, Red River College and Sisseton Wahpeton College bringing the member total to ten.

Nueta Hidatsa Sahnish College was admitted to the NIAC for the 2019-20 season.

Member schools

Former members 
Cankdeska Cikana Community College (2016-18)
Crossroads College
 Pillsbury Baptist Bible College
 Red Lake Nation College (2013-14)
 St. Cloud Technical & Community College

Champions

References

External links
Northern Intercollegiate Athletic Conference website

@NIACathletics on Twitter

College sports conferences in the United States